The 2010–11 season of Everton F.C. was Everton's 19th season in the Premier League and 57th consecutive season in the top division of English football. It was also Everton's 112th season of league football and 114th season in all competitions. The club began their pre-season friendly schedule on 10 July 2010 with a 3-match tour of Australia. Also, for the first time in club history, Everton played against and defeated their namesake, Chilean club Everton de Viña del Mar, 2–0 in a friendly at Goodison Park. The club entered the Football League Cup in the Second Round against Huddersfield Town and were knocked out in the subsequent round in an upset defeat away to Brentford. Everton entered the FA Cup in the Third Round Proper and were eliminated in the Fifth Round by Reading. The club's Premier League campaign began on 14 August against Blackburn Rovers at Ewood Park and concluded on 22 May against Chelsea at Goodison Park. For the first time since 2006–07, Everton did not participate in any European competitions.

Kit 
Supplier: Le Coq Sportif / Sponsor: Chang beer

Kit information 
The new home kit for the 2010-11 season was very plain - the large white 'V' on the collar and the trimmings were omitted. The away kit was, in contrast to the home kit, in a dazzling shade of 'lightning pink' with an indigo block on the upper chest. The third kit was officially called 'vanilla' with indigo shorts. There were two goalkeeper kits; the home version was in three tones of green; the other kit was mostly black with a yellow and white chest panel.

Matches

Pre-season friendlies 

On 30 April 2010, Everton confirmed on their official website that they would tour Australia as part of their pre-season preparation for their 2010–11 Premier League campaign.
Everton announced on 23 June that they will conclude their pre-season against Wolfsburg on 7 August.

Everton won the first match of the Australian tour, 1–0, over Sydney FC. In front of 40,446 spectators at Stadium Australia, the Toffees' new "lightning pink" away strips made their on-pitch debut as Victor Anichebe scored the lone goal of the match in the 46th minute. Everton continued their pre-season success with a 2–0 victory over Melbourne Heart. Recent signings Jermaine Beckford and João Silva made their Everton debuts as Jack Rodwell and Louis Saha scored. In the third and final match of the "Everton Down Under" tour, the Toffees completed the three-match sweep of Australian clubs, beating Brisbane Roar 2–1. Rodwell scored for the second game in a row, and recent transfer Magaye Gueye scored his first for the Blues.

Everton made their return to home soil with a 3–0 win away to Preston North End. Everton scored all three goals in the second half, two from Beckford and another from Saha. The toffees won their fifth consecutive pre-season friendly with a 4–2 victory at Norwich City that featured a Tim Cahill hat-trick. Cahill scored a brace in the first half for the 2–0 lead at the break. Norwich tied the game with goals in the 46th and 58th minutes. However, Diniyar Bilyaletdinov scored in the 59th minute, and Cahill notched his third of the day in the 71st to secure the victory. Everton's next match – their only match at Goodison during the entire pre-season – was a 2–0 victory for the Brotherhood Cup over their namesake, Chilean club Everton de Viña del Mar. Everton's goals both came in the second half, one each from Beckford and Bilyaletdinov, and referee Mark Halsey made his return to a welcoming crowd following his year-long hiatus from football due to a bout with lymphoma. The match featured several firsts. It was the first time that a Chilean club had ever been invited to play a match in Europe, and it was also the first time that Everton had ever faced one of their namesake clubs, which also exist in Argentina and Uruguay. Everton suffered their first loss of the pre-season in their final summer friendly, 2–0, away to German club Wolfsburg. Wolfsburg outplayed Everton throughout the match and went into the break with both goals already scored, one each from Mario Mandžukić and Karim Ziani.

Premier League

August 

Everton opened their season on 14 August at Ewood Park, falling 1–0 to Blackburn Rovers. In the fourteenth minute, goalkeeper Tim Howard mishandled the ball, dropping it at the feet of Nikola Kalinić, who put the ball in the net. Following the game, manager David Moyes came to the defence of Howard, saying that the team's lack of attacking pressure from the forwards and midfielders were equally to blame for the loss. Everton's second match saw the club earn their first point of the season in a 1–1 draw with Wolverhampton Wanderers at Goodison Park. Everton controlled possession and had more chances throughout much of the first half – Wolves manager Mick McCarthy going so far a saying that Wolves were "hopeless in the first half" – but a 43rd-minute goal by Tim Cahill was the only score of the first half. Wolves' 4–4–2 formation was scrapped by McCarthy in the second half in favour of a 4–5–1, which resulted in a more closely contested match. Wolves got the equaliser off the foot of Sylvan Ebanks-Blake, who tapped in a cross from Kevin Doyle during a fast break in the 74th minute. Everton's third match of the season saw the Toffees drop three points to Aston Villa, losing 1–0. Everton held advantages in possession and corner kicks earned, 68%–32% and 18–4, respectively, but were unable to turn their offensive pressure into a goal. Villa's goal came in the ninth minute when right back Luke Young charged up the center of the field and finished a pass from Ashley Young for his first goal in 22 months. With only one point through three matches, it marked Everton's worst start in a league season in over a decade.

September 

Everton's Premier League campaign resumed on 12 September against Manchester United at Goodison Park, following an international break for UEFA Euro 2012 qualifying. Wayne Rooney was notably not in United's squad; Sir Alex Ferguson held him out of the line-up to spare him from verbal abuse from Everton fans in regards to a recent personal allegation. Steven Pienaar opened the scoring in the 39th minute. United, however, scored the next three goals – one apiece from Darren Fletcher, Nemanja Vidić, and Dimitar Berbatov – for a 3–1 lead. Ultimately, though, the Toffees were able to salvage a point by scoring two injury time goals, first by Cahill and then by Mikel Arteta, for the 3–3 draw. Everton dropped the full three points to their next opponent, Newcastle United, losing 1–0 on a Hatem Ben Arfa goal scored just before half-time. In Everton's final match of September, the club travelled to Craven Cottage and went home with a single point following a 0–0 draw with Fulham. The draw left Everton at the bottom of the Premier League table and as the only club in the top four divisions of English football without a league win.

October 
Everton began October at St Andrew's and came away with their first league win of the season, a 2–0 victory over Birmingham City, whose top-flight club record of 18 undefeated home matches came to an end. The Toffees dominated possession and chances throughout much of the game, though the club's first away goal of the season continued to prove elusive until Roger Johnson knocked in an own goal to put Everton ahead in the 54th minute. A Tim Cahill header sealed the victory in added time. After the international break, Everton hosted Liverpool in the 214th Merseyside Derby. Liverpool's new owners, John W. Henry and Tom Werner, attended the match mere days after buying the club. Despite having less possession and less shots on target, Everton won the match 2–0 with goals from Tim Cahill, who became Everton's highest post-War, Merseyside derby goalscorer, in the first half and Mikel Arteta with a strike from just outside the 18-yard box in the second half. The following week Everton travelled to White Hart Lane to face Tottenham. Everton took the lead in the 17th minute after Leighton Baines converted a free-kick following Younès Kaboul's foul on Yakubu on the edge of the 18-yard box. Everton's lead was short lived however with Spurs levelling three minutes later after Tim Howard's goalkeeping error gifted Rafael van der Vaart a tap-in finish. Everton next faced Stoke at Goodison with the knowledge that a victory would see them rise into the top half of the Premier League table. After a goalless first half, Yakubu scored the only goal of the match in the 67th minute with a left-footed finish after Tim Cahill's shot hit the woodwork, handing Everton the win and also breaking his own six-month goal drought. Everton's successful form in October – three wins and one draw – turned their season around, and led to David Moyes being awarded the Manager of the Month award.

November 
Everton's first match in November was against Blackpool at Bloomfield Road. Everton twice came from a goal down as the match ended in a 2–2 draw. Tim Cahill scored with a header, his 50th Premier League goal, three minutes after Neal Eardley gave the hosts the lead. Séamus Coleman then scored his first Premier League goal for Everton in the second half following David Vaughan's strike two minutes earlier. Everton then hosted Bolton mid-week. Everton dominated possession and shots for much of the match, however they went behind in the 79th minute after Ivan Klasnić's goal. Six minutes later Marouane Fellaini was sent off, in his first match after returning from injury, after lashing out at Paul Robinson after the latter's tackle. It appeared that the result would not go Everton's way, however substitute Jermaine Beckford ensured Everton would earn a point after his strike, which met the top corner of the net from the left side of the penalty area, in the fourth minute of extra time. This result stretched Everton's unbeaten run in the Premier League to seven matches. Everton then hosted Arsenal, having lost the previous season's corresponding fixture 1–6, Everton were looking to improve on this result. Jack Rodwell played in his first match after injury, substituting on at half time, in a losing effort for the home side. Everton conceded a goal either side of half-time to Bacary Sagna and Cesc Fàbregas, before Tim Cahill got one back two minutes from full-time. With the end result being 1–2, Everton lost their first league match since September. Everton's next match was a Monday night fixture away against Sunderland at the Stadium of Light, Everton took an early lead after Tim Cahill found the net from Leighton Baines' cross. Sunderland's, Manchester United loanee, Danny Welbeck then scored a goal either side of half-time to give Sunderland a 2 – 1 lead. Mikel Arteta then equalised with a strike from 20 yards that deflected off Phil Bardsley, Jermaine Beckford then had an injury-time chance to win the game for Everton but was unable to convert when one-on-one with Sunderland goalkeeper Craig Gordon. The following week Everton hosted West Brom, Everton found themselves down two goals inside with 30 minutes after Paul Scharner's strike and Chris Brunt's 30-yard free kick. Tim Cahill then scored his eighth goal of the season with a close range header from Leighton Baines' assist, it was the sixth time that Baines and Cahill had combined for a Cahill goal in the season. Mikel Arteta was then dismissed for violent conduct, before Somen Tchoyi put West Brom up 3 – 1 soon after Sylvain Distin scored an own goal to close the match out for the Baggies, the only sour note for West Brom was the late sending off of Youssuf Mulumbu after his second bookable offence in as many minutes.

Results

League Cup 
Everton entered the Football League Cup in the second round and were drawn against Huddersfield Town, 1–0 winners over Carlisle United in the first round. Everton made fairly easy work of Huddersfield in a 5–1 victory with goals from Marouane Fellaini, Jack Rodwell, Jermaine Beckford, Louis Saha, and Leon Osman. The Terriers cut it to within a goal in the 40th minute on a John Heitinga own-goal, but Beckford restored the two-goal lead and scored his first competitive goal for Everton from the penalty spot in the 50th minute. Huddersfield's Lee Peltier was sent off for receiving his second yellow card in the 71st minute, essentially eliminating the possibility of a comeback. Everton's third round match was against League One club Brentford. David Moyes started a near-full strength side as the Toffees went down 4–3 on penalties after a 1–1 draw through extra time. Séamus Coleman opened the scoring in the sixth minute, but the team was unable to finish its chances throughout the rest of the match. Brentford were able to draw even shortly before the half when Gary Alexander struck in the 41st minute. Ján Mucha, filling in for regular starter Tim Howard, saved a second half penalty but was unable to stop any of the four shootout chances following a scoreless extra time. After Leighton Baines, Phil Neville, and Mikel Arteta scored in the shootout, Jermaine Beckford was saved and Phil Jagielka hit the bar to seal the win for Brentford, whose fans flooded the pitch in celebration.

FA Cup 

Everton enter the FA Cup in the third round, Everton drew Scunthorpe United on 28 November 2010. It was only the third meeting between the two teams after Everton won a two-legged League Cup tie 6–0 in the Second round of the 1997–98 Football League Cup.

Players

First team squad

Transfers in

Transfers out

Loans in

Loans out

Player awards 
 Player of the Season- Leighton Baines
 Players' Player of the Season - Leighton Baines
 Young Player of the Season - Séamus Coleman
 Reserve / U21 Player of the Season - Jose Baxter
 Academy Player of the Season - Jake Bidwell
 Goal of the Season - Leighton Baines vs. Chelsea

Statistics

Appearances 

|}

Goalscorers

Assists

Disciplinary record 

Last updated on 25 May 2011.

Trophies 

 Translink Cup vs Brisbane Roar – July
 Brotherhood Cup vs. CD Everton – August

References

External links 
 
 2010–11 fixture schedule at official website 

2010-11
2010–11 Premier League by team